Mariya Ralcheva (born 22 August 1978) is a Ukrainian sprint canoeist who competed in the early to mid-2000s. She won a silver medal in the K-4 1000 m event at the 2003 ICF Canoe Sprint World Championships in Gainesville.

Ralcheva also finished fifth in the K-4 500 m event at the 2000 Summer Olympics in Sydney.

References

Sports-reference.com profile

1978 births
Canoeists at the 2000 Summer Olympics
Living people
Olympic canoeists of Ukraine
Ukrainian female canoeists
ICF Canoe Sprint World Championships medalists in kayak